Xenus is the genus name of:

 Xenus (fungus), a lichen sac fungus in the order Pyrenulales
 Xenus (bird), a genus of birds in the family Scolopacidae